"Undefeated" is a 2011 song by British hard rock band Def Leppard from their live album Mirror Ball – Live & More. It was the first single from the album, and was released publicly via a YouTube clip on 12 April 2011 after having been played for the first time on Planet Rock the same day.  The song was made available for purchase via iTunes on 16 April.

Background
A review of the song by Ultimate Classic Rock gave it a rating of two and a half out of five stars, and, while praising Joe Elliott's vocals, said that "[w]hile it's not a bad song, the whole thing just comes across as something that's been done before."

The song was used as the opener for most set lists for the Mirrorball and Rock of Ages 2012 tours. It was also played during the Viva! Hysteria residency in Las Vegas on 29 March 2013 where it was recorded and later released on the live album Viva! Hysteria.

References

Def Leppard songs
2011 singles
2011 songs
Songs written by Joe Elliott